The Inland Petroleum Distribution System (IPDS) a rapid deployment, general support, bulk fuel storage and pipeline system designed to move bulk fuel forward in a theater of operations. The IPDS system has three primary subsystems: tactical petroleum terminal, pipeline segments, and pump stations.

The IPDS was designed by and for the U.S. Army and U.S. Marine Corps for use with the U.S. Navy Offshore Petroleum Distribution System (OPDS). OPDS tankers are the SS Mount Washington, SS American Osprey, SS Petersburg, and SS Chesapeake.

References

Petroleum infrastructure in the United States